Jałówka may refer to the following places in Podlaskie Voivodeship, north-east Poland:
Jałówka, Gmina Michałowo
Jałówka, Gmina Supraśl
Jałówka, Gmina Dąbrowa Białostocka
Jałówka, Gmina Sidra
Jałówka, Gmina Sokółka
Jałówka, site of a Jewish cemetery in Narewka